Merion station is a SEPTA Regional Rail station on the Paoli/Thorndale Line, located in Merion, Pennsylvania just outside of Philadelphia. The station building, constructed in 1914 by the Pennsylvania Railroad, is a designated historic building. SEPTA completed renovations of the station building's slate tile roof and the westbound canopy in late 2007. In 2017, the average total weekday boardings at this station was 286, and the average total weekday alightings was 284.

Amtrak stopped some westbound Silverliner Service trains at Merion until 1979.

Station layout
Merion has two low-level side platforms with pathways connecting the platforms to the inner tracks.

References

External links

SEPTA – Merion Station
Station from Google Maps Street View

SEPTA Regional Rail stations
Former Pennsylvania Railroad stations
Philadelphia to Harrisburg Main Line
Railway stations opened in 1914
Lower Merion Township, Pennsylvania
Railway stations in Montgomery County, Pennsylvania
Former Amtrak stations in Pennsylvania